Ortygia was a town of ancient Ionia. 

Its site is near Kirazlı, Asiatic Turkey.

References

Populated places in ancient Ionia
Former populated places in Turkey